Post-Ebola virus syndrome (or post-Ebola syndrome) is a post-viral syndrome affecting those who have recovered from infection with Ebola.  Symptoms include joint and muscle pain, eye problems, including blindness, various neurological problems, and other ailments, sometimes so severe that the person is unable to work.  Although similar symptoms had been reported following previous outbreaks in the last 20 years, health professionals began using the term in 2014 when referring to a constellation of symptoms seen in people who had  recovered from an acute attack of Ebola disease.

Signs and symptoms

Researchers have been aware of a group of symptoms that frequently followed Ebola virus disease for 20 years, but it became more widely reported with the large number of survivors of the deadly epidemic in West Africa in 2014.
Post Ebola syndrome may manifest as joint pain, muscle pain, chest pain, fatigue, hearing loss, hair loss, cessation of menstruation, and poor long term health. Some survivors report neurological issues including memory problems and anxiety attacks. Vision loss is also frequently reported, along with eye pain, inflammation, and blurred vision. Two papers published in the New England Journal of Medicine in 2015 report that symptoms include lethargy, joint pains, hair loss, and  vision loss, frequently to the point of near blindness, and uveitis.

Mechanism

Although, there is some progress that may potentially help Ebola survivors, adequate funding and further research is required to help provide more answers about post-Ebola syndrome.

Studies from previous outbreaks reveal that the virus is able to survive for months after recovery in some parts of the body such as the eyes and testes, where the immune system cannot reach.   It is not known if the neurologic symptoms seen in survivors are a direct result of the virus or, instead, triggered by the immune system's response to the infection.  It is known that Ebola can trigger a massive cytokine storm that can cause bleeding throughout the body, including the brain, which may explain various neurological symptoms that have been reported.

Diagnosis
In terms of diagnosis, the individual may show sensitivity to light or eye redness when ocular problems are suspected. Neurologically the individual's coordination, gait and frontal release signs should be observed.

Management
Management depends on the symptoms displayed, for example, if the individual indicates muscular-skeletal pain then paracetamol may be administered. If the individual presents with ocular problems, then prednisone and cyclopentolate may be used for treatment, according to the WHO.

Prognosis

Viral persistence and transmission
According to a review by Brainard, et al., Ebola virus was identified in almost 3 out of 4 seminal fluid samples (18 survivors) almost 4 months after initial infection, with the last positive samples being more than 6 months (203 days) after infection had occurred. Another aspect of survivors of the Ebola virus, is that it could become sexually transmitted, as the virus is present in semen nine months after the individuals are declared free of Ebola. A 2017 study found the virus in the semen of some men after more than two years following the recovery from the acute infection and in one case, Ebola viral RNA was identified up to 40 months after illness.

At the start of 2021 an outbreak of EVD that caused 18 cases and 9 deaths in Guinea is thought to be due to a West Africa Ebola outbreak survivor. This individual apparently infected a woman more than 5 years after he himself had incurred the infection

Research
Researchers from the National Institute of Neurological Disorders and Stroke (NINDS) and Liberian research partners are doing a 5-year follow-up study of 1500 Ebola survivors in Liberia.  Survivors will be evaluated every 6 months; as of October 2017, two follow-ups have been performed.  Researchers will track relapses and viral persistence, characterize  sequelae in various bodily systems, and do clinical studies on pharmacologic interventions and vaccines.

PREVAIL III (Partnership for Research on Ebola Vaccines in Liberia III), a study of survivors and their contacts, a collaboration between NIAID and Liberia, was planned in late 2014. Early results described abdominal, chest, neurologic, musculoskeletal, and ocular challenges faced by survivors.

PREVAIL IV examined if a medication, GS-5734, could help men with persistent Ebola virus RNA in semen to eliminate it, and thereby reduce the potential risk for sexual transmission.

PREVAIL VII examined if survivors of Ebola virus disease had evidence of Ebola virus RNA in aqueous humor and outcomes of cataract surgery relative to the local population.

See also 
 Ebola virus epidemic in West Africa
 List of Ebola outbreaks

References

Further reading

External links 

Ebola
West African Ebola virus epidemic
Syndromes caused by microbes